Choi Tae-min (5 May 1912 – 1 May 1994) was the leader of the Church of Eternal Life, a South Korean cult combining elements of Buddhism, Christianity, and traditional Korean Shamanism. Choi, originally a Buddhist monk, then a convert to Presbyterian pastor, was married six times. He was the mentor of the impeached South Korean president, Park Geun-hye (the daughter of former president Park Chung-hee), until his death in 1994. He allegedly used his relationship with Park to solicit bribes from government officials and businessmen. In late 2016, a scandal involving his daughter, Choi Soon-sil, broke out, with allegations that she too has exerted undue influence over President Park.

History 
Choi Tae-min set up a religious group called Yongsae-gyo, or "Church of the Spirit World", and declared himself Maitreya, or a "Future Buddha". He befriended Park Geun-hye soon after her mother, Yuk Young-soo, was assassinated in 1974. According to a report by the Korean Central Intelligence Agency from the 1970s that was published by a South Korean news magazine in 2007, Choi initially approached Park Geun-hye by telling her that her mother had appeared to him in his dreams, asking him to help her daughter.

Choi was an associate of former-president President Park Chung-hee until the latter's death by assassination in 1979. Kim Jae-gyu, the director of the KCIA who assassinated President Park Chung-hee, told a court that one of his motives was what he called the president's failure to stop Choi Tae-min's corrupt activities and keep him away from his daughter.

In a newspaper interview in 2007, Park Geun-hye called Choi a patriot and said she was grateful for his counsel and comfort during "difficult times".

Also in 2007, a diplomatic cable made public through WikiLeaks, the American Embassy in Seoul reported rumors that Mr. Choi, a 'Korean Rasputin', "had complete control over Park’s body and soul during her formative years and that his children accumulated enormous wealth as a result."

Frequently-used names
He used seven different names:
 Choi Do-won (1927)
 Choi Sang-hun (1945)
 Choi Bong-su (1951)
 Choi Toe-un (1954)
 Gong Hae-nam (1969)
 Bang Min (1971)
 Choi Tae-min (1975)

References

Founders of new religious movements
South Korean activists
South Korean Buddhist monks
South Korean police officers
People from Sariwon
1912 births
1994 deaths
Park Geun-hye
20th-century South Korean businesspeople
20th-century Buddhist monks